The 1973 Volta a Catalunya was the 53rd edition of the Volta a Catalunya cycle race and was held from 12 September to 19 September 1973. The race started in Amposta and finished in Lleida. The race was won by Domingo Perurena.

General classification

References

1973
Volta
1973 in Spanish road cycling
September 1973 sports events in Europe